The 2004 Baladeh earthquake occurred on May 28 in northern Iran. This dip-slip earthquake had a moment magnitude of 6.3 and a maximum Mercalli intensity of VIII (Severe). Total deaths for the event amounted to 35, with 278–400 injured, and $15.4 million in damage.

See also 
 List of earthquakes in 2004
 List of earthquakes in Iran

References

External links
M 6.3 - northern Iran – United States Geological Survey

2004 disasters in Iran
Earthquakes in Iran
2004 earthquakes
2004 in Iran
May 2004 events in Asia
History of Mazandaran Province